Charlestown Azzurri FC  (formerly Charlestown City Blues FC) is an Australian soccer club based in Whitebridge, a suburb of Newcastle, New South Wales. The club currently competes in the National Premier Leagues Northern NSW (NPL NNSW).

History
Charlestown United was founded in 1900, while Hamilton Azzurri was founded in 1963 which later became Highfields Azzurri during the 1970s. In 2006, Highfields Azzurri became Azzurri FC. In 2009, Football Federation Australia forced Azzurri to change its name.

After the 2009 season, the club became Charlestown City Blues FC, when Azzurri FC and Charlestown United merged.

In 2014, Charlestown City was accepted into the National Premier Leagues Northern NSW (NPL NNSW). The Blues finished in 4th place in the first season of the NPL NNSW, qualifying for the finals series.

In October 2017, Azzurri announced the signing of former Socceroo Ljubo Milicevic.

The 2018 season saw Charlestown finish in 6th place in the league. Scott Smith and Kane Goodchild were the side's leading goalscorers with 7 goals each. The club also enjoyed FFA Cup success, progressing to the round of 32 for the first time in their history, where they were defeated by Heidelberg United.

Current squad

References

External links
 Official club website

National Premier Leagues clubs
Soccer clubs in New South Wales
Association football clubs established in 1900
1900 establishments in Australia
Italian-Australian backed sports clubs of New South Wales
Association football clubs established in 1963